Grimley may mean:

Grimley, Worcestershire - a village in England
Ed Grimley - a television character
Martyn Grimley (born 1963) - a former field hockey player
Robert William Grimley, dean of the Diocese of Bristol.

See also:
The Grimleys - a television comedy series